WLKB (89.1 FM) is a radio station broadcasting a contemporary Christian format. Licensed to Bay City, Michigan, it is a member of the K-LOVE radio network. The station's signal reaches from the West Branch area southward to north of Flint and westward to Mount Pleasant.

The station began broadcasting in July 1993 as "The Rock" WTRK, a locally-originating Christian CHR/Rock station. The station was popular in local ratings due to providing an edgier-styled Christian music format not available elsewhere in the area at the time. However, with only 2,000 watts of power the station's signal did not reach far outside Bay City.

WTRK dropped local programming in 2004 to affiliate with Educational Media Foundation's Air 1 format. Two years later, EMF purchased the station outright and began the process of upgrading WTRK's signal from 2,000 to 50,000 watts. In December 2006, WTRK swapped programming and calls with K-Love sister station WLKB 90.9 FM licensed to Freeland, Michigan.

References
Michiguide.com - WLKB History

External links

Contemporary Christian radio stations in the United States
K-Love radio stations
Radio stations established in 1993
1993 establishments in Michigan
Educational Media Foundation radio stations
LKB